Trichocladus goetzei is a species of plant in the family Hamamelidaceae. It is found in Malawi and Tanzania.

References

Hamamelidaceae
Vulnerable plants
Taxonomy articles created by Polbot
Afromontane flora